"Further Away" is a song by Manic Street Preachers, released as the third single from their album Everything Must Go in Japan only in October 1996, replacing the UK single release "Kevin Carter". The single is all but the same as the UK CD1 counterpart merely switching the title track. It included "Horses Under Starlight", "Sepia" and "First Republic", while the cassette included an acoustic version of "Everything Must Go". No music video was made for the song.

The B-side, "Sepia", is a reference to the final scene of Butch Cassidy and the Sundance Kid, where the two main characters are shown in freeze frame, which then is colourised to sepia tone.

Track listing
CD
 "Further Away"
 "Horses Under Starlight"
 "Sepia"
 "First Republic"

MC
 "Further Away"
 "Everything Must Go" (acoustic version)

References

External links
 BBC article on the song

1996 singles
Manic Street Preachers songs
Songs written by Nicky Wire
Songs written by James Dean Bradfield
Songs written by Sean Moore (musician)
1996 songs